Beatrice Cynthia Freeman (January 10, 1915 – October 22, 1988), pseudonym of Bea Feinberg, was an American novelist.

Biography 
She was born in New York City in 1915 to Albert C. and Sylvia Jeannette (Hack) Freeman and shortly after her birth moved to San Francisco. She dropped out of school and was tutored by her mother. She attended the University of California, Berkeley at the age of fifteen. She married Herman Feinberg at the age of eighteen and had two children, Sheldon and Arlene.

Her husband died in May 1986 and her daughter died in 1985.

Cynthia Freeman died of cancer in San Francisco in 1988, aged 73. She was Jewish.

Career 
As a young girl, she began writing books but abandoned writing to pursue a career running an interior decoration business. When poor health forced her to give up her business, she decided to dust off an old manuscript from childhood but discovered the cleaning lady had thrown it out. From memory, she rewrote the story.

Freeman specialized in multi-generational stories of Jewish families, centering on a female protagonist. Her novel, No Time For Tears, was No.10 on the list of bestselling novels in the United States for 1981 as determined by The New York Times. Her books were translated into thirty-three languages, selling more than twenty million copies worldwide.

Bibliography
A World Full of Strangers  (1975)
Fairytales  (1977)
The Days of Winter  (1978)
Portraits  (1979)
Come Pour the Wine  (1980)
No Time For Tears  (1981)
Illusions of Love  (1984)
Seasons of the Heart  (1986)
The Last Princess  (1988)
Always and Forever  (1990)

References

External links
 Encyclopedia of Jewish Women: Cynthia Freeman

1915 births
1988 deaths
20th-century American novelists
American women novelists
Deaths from cancer in California
Writers from New York City
Jewish American novelists
20th-century American women writers
Novelists from New York (state)
Jewish women writers
20th-century American Jews
University of California, Berkeley alumni